is a train station in Hayashima, Tsukubo District, Okayama Prefecture, Japan.

Lines
West Japan Railway Company
Uno Line

Adjacent stations

Railway stations in Okayama Prefecture